Devosia epidermidihirudinis is a Gram-negative, rod-shaped bacteria from the genus of Devosia.

References

External links
Type strain of Devosia epidermidihirudinis at BacDive -  the Bacterial Diversity Metadatabase

Hyphomicrobiales
Bacteria described in 2013